Mala is a Telugu caste from the Indian states of Andhra Pradesh and Telangana. They are also present in smaller numbers in the states of Karnataka and Maharashtra. They are considered as Scheduled Caste (SC) by the Government of India. According to 2001 census data, Malas constituted 41.6 percent (51.39 lakh) of the Scheduled Castes population in the then state of Andhra Pradesh, which also included the present state of Telangana.

History
Malas are said to be Hill Warriors and they were raiders and warrior for Polygars of Vijayanagara.

In the 12th century, Palanati Brahmanaidu, the minister of Palnadu, adopted Kannamma Dasu, a Mala, who took part in the Battle of Palnadu and got martyred. His descendants were called Mala Dasulus who became head priests of Chennakesava Swamy Temples..malas are traditional silk weavers as well.Even these sects exists presently in some parts of Andhrapradesh

In the 19th century, many Malas, especially in coastal Andhra, converted to Lutheranism after the arrival of Christian missionaries.

In 1917, Bhagya Reddy Varma & Aringe Ramaswamy organised Adi-Andhra movement led Malas alongside Madigas to be part of Dravidian ideology. In the census of 1931, about a lot of them mentioned their castes as Adi Andhra and were officially included into the list of Depressed Classes in 1935 Govt. of India Acts and later got carried in 1950 Constitution of India.

With the advent of the Green revolution, Reddys, who had bought up lands from the erstwhile Brahmin landlords. However, the landless Dalits (mainly Malas) and backward classes still faced dire circumstances due to lack of support from various governments. Dalits were unable to obtain land, or quality education. Starting in the 1980s with the political ascendancy of the Reddy communities, Malas and other Dalits became the targets of violence with increasing frequency and brutality. Influenced by Ambedkarite and Marxist thought, the Dalit Mahasabha, with charismatic leaders such as Katti Padma Rao and Bhojja Tarakam sought the annihilation of caste and untouchability through social transformation, very different from the Gandhian ideals of "upliftment." Their demands also included true land reform. A boost to their organization occurred after the brutal Tsundur massacre of 1991, where Reddy’s slaughtered 8 Malas. However, the movement was weakened when Rao sought to enter electoral politics.

Politics 
When the Bahujan Samaj Party and Samajwadi Party won the Uttar Pradesh assembly elections in 1993, it gave hope to Rao that a similar victory could be achieved in Andhra Pradesh. However, because of this, the movement split: with Rao leading a faction favouring political influence and Tarakam leading a separate faction. Rao's dreams were shattered by the assembly elections of 1994, where the TDP promised a slew of populist schemes to counter the mobilization of subaltern castes and won decisively.

Tarakam opposed the 'Madiga Dandora Movement' in 1990s related to categorisation of the Scheduled Caste quota and denied allegations of snatching major share of caste quotas and established 'Mala Mahanadu' to counter its demands. However, the CBN government, sensing an opportunity to divide the Dalits, established a commission which recommended sub-categorization of SC quota. This infuriated the Malas and inexorably divided the Malas and Madigas, so that a united Dalit movement would be less strong than earlier.

Culture
The Mala of Andhra Pradesh are considered a right-hand community, whilst the Madiga of the region are the left-hand.

Distribution
According to Government of India census data from 2001, Malas constituted 41.6 percent (5,139,305) of the Scheduled Castes (SC) population in the then state of Andhra Pradesh, which has subsequently been bifurcated by the creation of Telangana state.

They are also classified as a Scheduled Caste in Karnataka.

Mala Christians

A significant section of the Mala, and almost all in Coastal Andhra, turned to Christianity but after noticing the similar caste politics in the Telugu Catholic church, shifted to Protestantism instead. They are mainly prominent in the Andhra Evangelical Lutheran Church (AELC) and Church of South India (CSI).

They made good use of the Christian educational programs, elevating some of their social position and now form part of the lower middle class. These Christian Malas are commonly called Merugumala people, who came from Godavari Krishna basin. They falls under, "Backward Classes -C" category with 1% Reservation at state level and at national level they come under Other Backward Class.

They have been demanding central Government to accord them SC status on par with Dalit Buddhists, Dalit Sikhs and not to discriminate them on religious grounds for being Dalit Christians. The case related to their demand is pending with the Supreme Court of India since 2005.

See also
List of Malas

References

Further reading

Dalit communities
Telugu society
Ethnic groups in India
Scheduled Castes of Andhra Pradesh
Scheduled Castes of Karnataka
Scheduled Castes of Telangana